Trapania aurata is a species of sea slug, a dorid nudibranch, a marine gastropod mollusc in the family Goniodorididae.

Distribution
This species was described from Hong Kong, China. It has also been reported from New Caledonia.

Description
The body of this goniodorid nudibranch is opaque white. The gills are white and the rhinophores and the lateral papillae are orange. The oral tentacles are orange and there is usually an orange line extending from the tip of the tail partway towards the gills. The coloration is similar to Trapania vitta except that in that species the lateral papillae are entirely white. Trapania gibbera is another species which is mainly white.

Ecology
Trapania aurata probably feeds on Entoprocta which often grow on sponges and other living substrata.

References

Goniodorididae
Gastropods described in 1987